BSTV may represent:

 Bi-scalar tensor vector gravity
 BSTV, also called The Pilot Show
 BS-TV, a show made by Bentley University
 Bergen Student-TV
 Abbreviation of BISU Student Television, the student-run television station at Beijing International Studies University